Cychrus auvrayorum is a species of ground beetle in the subfamily of Carabinae. It was described by Deuve & Mourzine in 1997.

References

auvrayorum
Beetles described in 1997